This is a list of electoral results for the Electoral district of Serpentine-Jarrahdale in Western Australian state elections.

Members for Serpentine-Jarrahdale

Election results

Elections in the 2000s

References

Western Australian state electoral results by district